Robinia viscosa, commonly known in its native territory as clammy locust, is a medium-sized deciduous tree native to the southeastern United States.

References

Robinieae
Trees of the Southeastern United States